Sergio Adriano Benedetti (28 October 1942 – 24 January 2018) was an Italian art historian and formerly Head Curator and Keeper of the Collection of the National Gallery of Ireland.

He was best known for his rediscovery of the Baroque masterpiece, The Taking of Christ by Michelangelo Merisi da Caravaggio in 1990. In 1994 he was awarded the rank of Commander of the Order of Merit of the Italian Republic for his services to art and culture.

Notes

1942 births
2018 deaths
Italian art historians
People from Addis Ababa
Expatriates in Italian East Africa